The Songs I Love was Perry Como's 11th RCA Victor 12" long-play album and the first featuring RCA Victor's Dynagroove technology.

Perry Como hosted an hour-long program on NBC TV until June 1963, the year that The Songs I Love was released. A regular feature of the show would seat Como on a distinctive set that spelled out "Mr. C." while he would croon a favorite song. A photo of the set adorns the cover of Songs I Love. This album reproduces the effect of that segment (which producers Hugo & Luigi describe as "one of the few great traditions in television") over a dozen soft ballads such as "Fly Me to the Moon (In Other Words)" and "This Is All I Ask." The leadoff track, "The Songs I Love", sets the tone for everything that follows, and, not surprisingly, it turns out that pop standards are the songs Como loves. The Songs I Love was a commercially successful album aimed at fans of The Perry Como Show, to whom it is recommended.

Track listing
Side one
"The Songs I Love" (music by Jimmy Van Heusen and lyrics by Sammy Cahn) - 3:20
"(I Left My Heart) In San Francisco" (music by George Cory and lyrics by Douglas Cross) - 3:17
"Fly Me to the Moon"  (In Other Words) (words and music by Bart Howard) - 3:20
"Slightly Out of Tune" (music by Antônio Carlos Jobim) - 3:12
"This is All I Ask" (words and music by Gordon Jenkins) - 3:18
"Hawaiian Wedding Song" (Ke Kali Nei Au ) - 2:37
   
Side two
"Days of Wine and Roses" (music by Henry Mancini and lyrics by Johnny Mercer) - 2:43
"Carnival" (Music by Luiz Bonfá and lyrics by Antonio Maria) - 3:24
 "My Coloring Book" (Music by John Kander and lyrics by Fred Ebb) - 3:33
"I Wanna Be Around" (words and music by Johnny Mercer and Sadie Vimmerstedt) - 3:00
 "When I Lost You" (words and music by Irving Berlin) - 2:55
"What Kind of Fool Am I?" (from the 1961 stage musical Stop the World I Want to Get Off) - 2:34

References

External links
Perry Como Discography

Perry Como albums
1963 albums
Albums produced by Hugo & Luigi
RCA Victor albums